"God Gave Rock and Roll to You"  is a 1973 song by the British band Argent and covered by Kiss as "God Gave Rock 'N' Roll To You II" in 1991, with modified lyrics.

Argent
Argent recorded the song in 1971 during the sessions for their album All Together Now, but it originally did not appear as an album track until 1973's In Deep, and was released as a successful single at that time. The 1997 CD re-release of All Together Now has the track included as a bonus. The original lyrics include a reference to British pop singer Cliff Richard, known for his Christianity.

The song reached No. 18 in the United Kingdom, and No. 114 in the United States.

Chart history

Petra
"God Gave Rock and Roll to You" was covered, with additional lyrics not found in the original recording, by American Christian rock band Petra for their 1977 album Come and Join Us and their 1984 album Beat the System.

Kiss

American hard rock band Kiss covered the song in 1991 as "God Gave Rock 'n' Roll to You II" for the soundtrack to Bill & Ted's Bogus Journey. The track was released as a single in 1991 and appeared on the band's 1992 album Revenge.

Though the power ballad covered the original Argent 1973 version "God Gave Rock and Roll to You", it had substantially modified lyrics in the verses, thus the reason behind the slight change in the name of the song. It is one of the few songs from Kiss' "non-makeup era" to be played live since the band returned to wearing their trademark makeup in 1996.

Personnel 

It was the last Kiss song to feature longtime drummer Eric Carr before his death three months later after it was released as a single. Although he was too ill to play drums on the track, he is featured on backing vocals during the a cappella break, singing the repeated line "...to everyone, he gave a song to be sung", as well as performing drums during the video for the song. He had lost all his hair from his chemotherapy treatments and wore a wig during the video shoot. The drum tracks were recorded by Eric Singer, who would become Kiss' full-time drummer following Carr's death.

The single was also the first to feature Gene Simmons and Paul Stanley sharing lead vocals since "I" from 1981's Music from "The Elder".

Chart performance 

The song proved to be a big hit for the band in many parts of the world, including making the top 10 in Ireland, the United Kingdom, Germany, and Switzerland. In the United States, it reached No. 21 on the Billboard Album Rock Tracks chart. The music video received heavy rotation on music television channels.

Versions 

The version released as a single and on the soundtrack to Bill & Ted's Bogus Journey differs slightly from that played in the film. In the film, a 40-second guitar solo is played by Steve Vai. It was later included on Steve Vai's album The Elusive Light and Sound, Vol. 1 under the title "Final Solo".

"God Gave Rock & Roll to You II" would also be included on the Kiss album Alive III, which was released in 1993.

Personnel 

 Paul Stanley – rhythm and lead guitar, lead vocals
 Gene Simmons – bass, lead vocals
 Bruce Kulick – lead guitar, backing vocals
 Eric Singer – drums, backing vocals
 Eric Carr – backing vocals

Charts 

Weekly charts

Year-end charts

References

External links 

 
 

1970s ballads
1973 singles
Songs written by Russ Ballard
Argent (band) songs
1971 songs
1991 singles
Kiss (band) songs
Rock ballads
Hard rock ballads
Song recordings produced by Bob Ezrin
Songs written by Bob Ezrin
Songs written by Gene Simmons
Songs written by Paul Stanley
Interscope Records singles
Songs about rock music